Rosie is a British sitcom written by Roy Clarke that was broadcast between 1977 and 1981. It was set in the fictitious Yorkshire town of Ravensbay, a name most probably derived from a combination of Ravenscar and Robin Hood's Bay, seaside villages near the seaside town of Scarborough, North Yorkshire where the series was filmed. The central character was PC Penrose ("Rosie"), a young and inexperienced police officer, played by Paul Greenwood.

The titular character is a nod towards Charles Penrose, who famously recorded the comedy song "The Laughing Policeman".

Rosie was preceded by an earlier series of seven episodes, broadcast in 1975, called The Growing Pains of PC Penrose which was set in the fictitious Yorkshire town of Slagcaster and filmed in Clarke's native South Yorkshire, with the majority of the opening scenes of series one filmed in the village of New Rossington, although the colliery shown in episode one is possibly Hatfield Colliery. The series then underwent a revamp with a new title (Rosie), setting and signature tune.

Cast 
Paul Greenwood as PC 'Rosie' Penrose
Tony Haygarth as PC Wilmot
Frankie Jordan as Gillian
Penny Leatherbarrow as WPC Brenda Whatmough
Paul Luty as Chief Inspector Dunwoody
Avril Elgar as Millie Penrose (series 1–3)
Patricia Kneale as Millie Penrose (series 4)
Lorraine Peters as Aunt Ida
Allan Surtees as Uncle Norman
Don McKillop as Bill (series 1–3)
Maggie Jones as Glenda (series 1–3)

Episodes 
(first airdate in parentheses)

Series 1 
"Woman Pressure" (5 January 1977)
"A Smile from Antonio" (12 January 1977)
"I Wish They Wouldn't Call Me Son" (19 January 1977)
"Sunday" (26 January 1977)
"Wholesale Fish" (2 February 1977)
"The Cheese and Wine" (9 February 1977)

Series 2 
"Mirror, Mirror on the Floor" (18 May 1978)
"Wilmot Gets a Bad Case of Big Cyril's Second Wife" (25 May 1978)
"Wilmot Gets an Even Worse Case of Big Cyril's Second Wife" (1 June 1978)
"The Eyes of the Law" (8 June 1978)
"Complications" (15 June 1978)
"Further Complications" (22 June 1978)
"Our Intrepid Birdmen" (29 June 1978)

Series 3 
"Those Wonderful People in the C.I.D." (7 June 1979)
"Free Sample" (14 June 1979)
"The Worm that Turns Us All" (21 June 1979)
"Happy Birthday, Mr Chizlehurst" (28 June 1979)
"Looking for Herbie" (5 July 1979)
"Turn Left at the Parrot" (12 July 1979)
"A Day in the Country" (19 July 1979)

Series 4 
"Tune on a Silent Dog Whistle" (18 September 1981)
"Arresting Gordon by Instalments" (25 September 1981)
"You're Beautiful, Miss Parkinson" (2 October 1981)
"The Eight-Foot Goat" (9 October 1981)
"Big Night at Freezi-Pops" (16 October 1981)
"An Informer for Engelbert" (23 October 1981)
"Caught in the Act" (30 October 1981)

DVD release 
The complete series (seven episodes) of The Growing Pains of PC Penrose was previously released on DVD in 2007; however, Rosie has not yet been released.

External links

1977 British television series debuts
1981 British television series endings
1970s British sitcoms
1980s British sitcoms
BBC television sitcoms
English-language television shows
Television shows set in Yorkshire
Scarborough, North Yorkshire